Il carro armato dell'8 settembre is a 1960 Italian film. It stars actor Gabriele Ferzetti.

Cast
 Gabriele Ferzetti: Tommaso
 Elsa Martinelli: Mirella
 Dorian Gray: soubrette
 Marisa Merlini: Palmira
 Yvonne Furneaux
 Mario Valdemarin
 Catherine Spaak
 Giacomo Furia
 Tiberio Murgia
 Romolo Valli
 Loris Gizzi
 Francesco Mulè
 Jean-Marc Bory: Carlo
 Bice Valori
 Antonio De Teffè
 Franca Dominici

Database of the documents produced by the Committee for the Theatrical Review of The Italian Ministry of Cultural Heritage and Activities, from 1944 to 2000.

External links
 

1960 films
Italian war drama films
1960s Italian-language films
1960s Italian films